Rambhau Mhalgi Prabodhini is a not-for-profit organisation established in memory of the Rambhau Mhalgi. Established in 1982, RMP is a learning and research organisation for government leadership aspirants  and current government leaders of India. RMP has been granted special consultative status by the United Nations Economic and Social Council. The organization operates nationally through its offices in Delhi, Pune, Mumbai, and its headquarters in Thane. Since its establishment in 1982, RMP has trained many government leaders. .

RMP is often linked with the Bharatiya Janata Party and right-wing Rashtriya Swayamsevak Sangh outfit. It is a recognized research centre by Mumbai University.

History

RMP government leadership training mission was implemented first at the behest of parliamentarian Rambhau Mhalgi. Mhalgi was influenced by RSS thinker and BJP leader Deendayal Upadhyaya, who had conceived the idea of a learning  establishment for government leadership aspirants and current government leaders of India. In 1982, Pramod Mahajan, senior BJP leader, opened Rambhau Mhalgi Prabodhini at Keshav Srushti campus at Uttan village, near Bhayandar.

In January 2020, the Congress party objected to training government officials at RMP citing right-wing political leaning of RMP.

References

External links
 

Organizations established in 1982
Organisations based in Mumbai
Leadership training
Democracy
Governance
1982 establishments in Maharashtra